Al Hinakiyah is one of the governorates in Al Madinah Region, Saudi Arabia.

References 

Populated places in Medina Province (Saudi Arabia)
Governorates of Saudi Arabia